The 2008 Speedway Grand Prix of Great Britain, known as the 2008 FIM Meridian Lifts British Speedway Grand Prix for sponsorship reasons, was the fifth race of the 2008 Speedway Grand Prix season. It took place on 28 June, in the Millennium Stadium in Cardiff, Wales, United Kingdom. The British Grand Prix is one of the four Super Prix events held in 2008. The winner in Cardiff will progress to the Super Prix final, taking gate 3 and the white helmet colour.

Riders 
Edward Kennett was nominated as a wild card after he finished 2nd at the 2008 British Speedway Championship. Tai Woffinden and Simon Stead were the next highest finishing non-Grand Prix riders and both will be track reserves at Cardiff. The starting positions draw was made on 18 June, at the FIM Headquarters in Mies, Switzerland.

Result 

Jason Crump from Australia was the winner of the British Grand Prix, he finished ahead of second placed Greg Hancock of the United States. Crump therefore takes the white helmet colour in the Super Prix final.

Nicki Pedersen benefited from controversial decisions by Polish referee Marek Wojaczek. Pedersen touched the tapes in an early heat, which should have resulted in a mandatory exclusion but Wojaczek allowed the race to continue and later, after an innocuous clash with Leigh Adams on the first corner of heat 17, Adams was excluded. In the first semi-final Bjarne Pedersen, who led the qualifying scorers with 14 points, clashed with his Nicki Pedersen in identical fashion to Adams and he, too, was excluded, much to the anger of the 45,000 crowd.

Great Britain's Scott Nicholls reached the final for the first time this year only to break the start tapes which resulted in his exclusion from the final. Nicki Pedersen fell in the final and therefore scored 0 points from the race, but still took third place on the podium. Nicki Pedersen still led the standings after the British Grand Prix, and it was the fifth time out of five Grand Prix that he had reached the final, although his first Grand Prix win in 2008 would not come until the following Czech Grand Prix.

Heat details

Heat after heat 
 (56.6) Iversen, Adams, Nicholls, Dryml
 (56.0) Harris, Holta, Lindgren, Gollob
 (55.8) Crump, N.Pedersen, Kennett, Kasprzak
 (56.9) Hancock, B.Pedersen, Jonsson, Andersen
 (55.9) Hancock, Adams, Harris, Kennett
 (56.5) Andersen, Gollob, N.Pedersen, Dryml
 (56.5) Nicholls, Jonsson, Kasprzak, Lindgren
 (56.8) B.Pedersen, Crump, Holta, Iversen
 (57.4) B.Pedersen, Gollob, Adams, Kasprzak
 (56.2) Crump, Harris, Jonsson, Dryml
 (57.6) Holta, Nicholls, Andersen, Kennett
 (56.7) Hancock, N.Pedersen, Lindgren (X/2x), Iversen (u)
 (56.2) Crump, Adams, Andersen, Lindgren (X/F)
 (57.2) Hancock, Kasprzak, Dryml, Holta
 (57.3) B.Pedersen, Nicholls, Harris, N. Pedersen
 (57.1) Iversen, Jonsson, Kennett, Gollob (E4)
 (57.1) N.Pedersen, Jonsson, Holta (X/F), Adams (X)
 (57.5) B.Pedersen, Kennett, Lindgren, Dryml
 (57.8) Crump, Nicholls, Hancock, Gollob
 (57.5) Andersen, Harris, Kasprzak, Iversen (X/F)
 Semi-Finals:
 (57.6) N.Pedersen, Nicholls, Andersen, B. Pedersen (X)
 (57.7) Hancock, Crump, Harris, Jonsson
 Final:
 (57.9) Crump (6 points), Hancock (4 points), N. Pedersen (F3), Nicholls (T)

The intermediate classification

See also 
 Speedway Grand Prix
 List of Speedway Grand Prix riders

References

External links 
 Speedway GP

Great Britain
Speedway Grand Prix of Great Britain
Speedway Grand Prix of Great Britain 2008
Speedway Grand Prix
Speedway Grand Prix
2000s in Cardiff